Ahmed II ( Aḥmed-i sānī) (25 February 1643 or 1 August 1642 – 6 February 1695) was the Sultan of the Ottoman Empire from 1691 to 1695.

Early life 
Ahmed II was born on 25 February 1643 or 1 August 1642, the son of Sultan Ibrahim and Muazzez Sultan. On 21 October 1649, Ahmed, along with his brothers Mehmed and Suleiman were circumcised.
During the reigns of his older brothers, Ahmed was imprisoned in Kafes, and he stayed there almost 43 years.

Reign

During his reign, Ahmed II devoted most of his attention to the wars against the Habsburgs and related foreign policy, governmental and economic issues. Of these, the most important were the tax reforms and the introduction of the lifelong tax farm system (malikâne). Following the recovery of Belgrade under his predecessor, Suleiman II, the military frontier reached a rough stalemate on the Danube, with the Habsburgs no longer able to advance south of it, and the Ottomans attempting, ultimately unsuccessfully, to regain the initiative north of it.

Among the most important features of Ahmed's reign was his reliance on Köprülüzade Fazıl Mustafa Pasha. Following his accession to the throne, Ahmed II confirmed Fazıl Mustafa Pasha in his office as grand vizier. In office from 1689, Fazıl Mustafa Pasha was from the Köprülü family of grand viziers, and like most of his Köprülü predecessors in the same office, was an able administrator and military commander. Like his father Köprülü Mehmed Pasha (grand vizier, 1656–61) before him, Fazıl Mustafa Pasha ordered the removal and execution of dozens of corrupt state officials of the previous regime and replaced them with men loyal to himself. He overhauled the tax system by adjusting it to the capabilities of the taxpayers affected by the latest wars. He also reformed troop mobilization and increased the pool of conscripts available for the army by drafting tribesmen in the Balkans and Anatolia. In October 1690, Fazıl Mustafa Pasha recaptured Belgrade, a key fortress that commanded the confluence of the rivers Danube and Sava; in Ottoman hands since 1521, the fortress had been conquered by the Habsburgs in 1688.

Fazıl Mustafa Pasha's victory at Belgrade was a major military achievement that gave the Ottomans hope that the military debacles of the 1680s—which had led to the loss of Hungary and Transylvania, an Ottoman vassal principality ruled by pro-Istanbul Hungarian princes—could be reversed. However, the Ottoman success proved ephemeral. On 19 August 1691, Fazıl Mustafa Pasha suffered a devastating defeat at the Battle of Slankamen at the hands of Louis William, the Habsburg commander in chief in Hungary, nicknamed “Türkenlouis” (Louis the Turk) for his victories against the Ottomans. In the confrontation, recognized by contemporaries as “the bloodiest battle of the century,” the Ottomans suffered heavy losses: 20,000 men, including the grand vizier. With him, the sultan lost his most capable military commander and the last member of the Köprülü family, who for the previous half century had been instrumental in strengthening the Ottoman military.

Under Fazıl Mustafa Pasha's successors, the Ottomans suffered further defeats. In June 1692 the Habsburgs conquered Oradea, the seat of an Ottoman governor since 1660. In 1694, they attempted to recapture Oradea, but to no avail. On 12 January 1695, they surrendered the fortress of Gyula, the center of an Ottoman sanjak (subprovince) since 1566. With the fall of Gyula, the only territory still in Ottoman hands in Hungary was to the east of the River Tisza and to the south of the river Maros, with its center at Timișoara. Three weeks later, on 6 February 1695, Ahmed II died in Edirne Palace.

Family

Consorts 
Ahmed II had two known consorts: 
Rabia Sultan (died Eski Palace, Istanbul, 14 January 1712, buried in Suleiman I Mausoleum, Süleymaniye Mosque). Ahmed II's most beloved consort and the last haseki sultan of the Ottoman Empire;
Şayeste Hatun (died 1710, Eski Palace, Istanbul). Second concubine of Ahmed II, perhaps mother of his other daughters.

Sons 
Ahmed II had two sons: 
Şehzade Ibrahim (Edirne Palace, Edirne, 6 October 1692 – Topkapı Palace, Istanbul, 4 May 1714, buried in Mustafa I Mausoleum, Hagia Sophia), with Rabia Sultan, Selim's twin, became crown prince on 22 August 1703 until his death;
Şehzade Selim (Edirne Palace, Edirne, 6 October 1692 – Edirne Palace, Edirne, 15 May 1693, buried in Sultan Mustafa Mausoleum, Hagia Sophia), with Rabia Sultan, Ibrahim's twin.

Daughters 
Ahmed II had, most probably, three daughters: 
Asiye Sultan (Edirne Palace, Edirne, 23 October 1694 – Eski Palace, Bayezid, Istanbul, 9 December 1695, buried in Suleiman I Mausoleum, Süleymaniye Mosque), with Rabia Sultan;
Atike Sultan (born 24 October 1694). Her existence is controversial. Due to the similar name and almost identical date of birth some historians believe she may be Asiye herself, whose birth was recorded incorrectly by some or that Atike was Asiye's second name. If she really was a different princess, she was probably the daughter of Şayeste Hatun.
Hatice Sultan, probably with Şayeste Hatun.

In addition to his daughters, Ahmed II was deeply attached to his niece Ümmügülsüm Sultan, daughter of his half-brother Mehmed IV, so much so that he treated her as if she were his own daughter.

References

Citations

Sources

Further reading

Michael Hochendlinger, Austria's Wars of Emergence: War, State and Society in the Habsburg Monarchy, 1683–1797 (London: Longman, 2003), 157–64.

External links 

1643 births
1695 deaths
Ottoman people of the Great Turkish War
17th-century Ottoman sultans
Turks from the Ottoman Empire